General Baxter may refer to:

Henry Baxter (1821–1873), Union Army brevet major general
Horace Henry Baxter (1818–1884), Vermont Militia Adjutant General in the American Civil War
Ian Baxter (1937–2017), British Army major general
Jedediah Hyde Baxter (1837–1890), U.S. Army brigadier general